Sander Arends and Adam Majchrowicz won the title, defeating Aliaksandr Bury and Andreas Siljeström in the final 6–3, 5–7, [10–8] .

Seeds

Draw

Draw

References
 Main Draw

Internationaux de Tennis de Vendee
Internationaux de Tennis de Vendée